The 2020 Duke's Mayo Bowl was a college football bowl game played on December 30, 2020, with kickoff at noon EST on ESPN. It was the 19th edition of the Duke's Mayo Bowl (formerly the Belk Bowl), and was one of the 2020–21 bowl games concluding the 2020 FBS football season. Duke's Mayonnaise was the title sponsor of the game.

Teams
Based on conference tie-ins, the Duke's Mayo Bowl was expected to feature teams from the Atlantic Coast Conference (ACC) and the Big Ten Conference. On December 20, teams from those conferences were announced as the game participants; Wake Forest of the ACC and Wisconsin of the Big Ten. This was the first meeting between the two programs.

Wake Forest Demon Deacons

Wake Forest entered the bowl with a 4–4 record (3–4 in conference play). The Demon Deacons played two ranked teams during the season, losing to Clemson and defeating Virginia Tech. Wake Forest had played in two prior editions of this bowl, winning the 2007 Meineke Car Care Bowl and 2017 Belk Bowl, when it was known by those names.

Wisconsin Badgers

Wisconsin entered the bowl with a 3–3 record, all in conference games. The Badgers played three ranked teams during the season, losing to each of Northwestern, Indiana, and Iowa. This was the first appearance by Wisconsin in this bowl.

Game summary

Statistics

Aftermath 
During their post-game locker room celebration, Wisconsin quarterback Graham Mertz accidentally dropped and shattered the game trophy.

References

External links

Game statistics at statbroadcast.com

Duke's Mayo Bowl
Duke's Mayo Bowl
Duke's Mayo Bowl
Duke's Mayo Bowl
Wake Forest Demon Deacons football bowl games
Wisconsin Badgers football bowl games